Ateloplus is a genus of shield-backed katydids in the family Tettigoniidae. There are about eight described species in Ateloplus.

Species
These eight species belong to the genus Ateloplus:
 Ateloplus coconino Hebard, 1935
 Ateloplus hesperus Hebard, 1934
 Ateloplus joaquin Rentz, 1972
 Ateloplus luteus Caudell, 1907 (yellow shieldback)
 Ateloplus minor Caudell, 1907
 Ateloplus notatus Scudder, 1901
 Ateloplus schwarzi Caudell, 1907
 Ateloplus splendidus Hebard, 1934

References

Further reading

 

Tettigoniinae
Articles created by Qbugbot